Benjamin Redwood Sedgemore (born 5 August  1975) is an English former professional footballer who played as a midfielder.

He played professionally for Northampton Town, Mansfield Town, Peterborough United, Mansfield Town, Macclesfield Town, Lincoln City, Cambridge United and Rushden & Diamonds. He played at non-league level for Canvey Island,  Havant & Waterlooville, Chelmsford City, King's Lynn, Boston United and Stamford.

Career
He previously played for Northampton Town, Mansfield Town, Peterborough United, Mansfield Town, Macclesfield Town, Lincoln City, Canvey Island and Cambridge United, and signed for Rushden & Diamonds in November 2006.

In January 2006 he joined Conference South side Havant & Waterlooville initially on loan as cover for Ian Baird's injury-hit side, making his debut in the 2–1 away defeat to Basingstoke Town on 13 January 2007. He remained with the Hawks until the end of the season, making 20 starts and three substitute appearances in their Football Conference South campaign. In the summer of 2007 he linked up with his ex-Canvey Island manager Jeff King at Chelmsford City but departed in October. In December 2007, he linked up with King's Lynn and helped them to win promotion.

In January 2009, Sedgemore was released by King's Lynn. His next port of call was a brief three-month stay with Boston United before signing for Stamford. He retired at the end of the 2010–11 season.

Personal life
By the time Sedgemore had retired from professional football, he had secured a BSc in Psychology and Law and a Masters from Loughborough University in Fiancé, Marketing And Management (as well as a host of coaching qualifications).
He later moved into event management - becoming CEO of a global event management company for 7 years. After 11 years in events, he moved to MM Flowers as Head of Commercial. His arrival coincided with significant growth for the company, as they assumed the status as the largest supplier of cut flowers in the UK Market within his first four years at the Company.

References

External links

Lincoln City F.C. Official Archive Profile
Rushden & Diamonds F.C. Official Web-site Profile
Havant & Waterlooville Official Web-site Profile
PFA interview on degree studies, May 2004
Discusses role on PFA Management Committee, early 2007
Unofficial Ben Sedgemore Profile at The Forgotten Imp

1975 births
Footballers from Wolverhampton
Living people
English footballers
Northampton Town F.C. players
Mansfield Town F.C. players
Peterborough United F.C. players
Macclesfield Town F.C. players
Lincoln City F.C. players
Canvey Island F.C. players
Cambridge United F.C. players
Rushden & Diamonds F.C. players
Havant & Waterlooville F.C. players
Chelmsford City F.C. players
King's Lynn F.C. players
Boston United F.C. players
Stamford A.F.C. players
Alumni of Loughborough University
Association football midfielders